Sin Gye-am (fl. 1620s-1630s) was a Jurchen and Manchu interpreter during the middle period of Korea's Joseon Dynasty. He belonged to the Pyeongsan Sin bon-gwan. Beginning in 1629, he went to Shenyang, then the Qing Dynasty capital, to study the Manchu language and its new script. By 1637, he had translated five works from the old Jurchen script into the new Manchu script, and would go on to translate more. Among the works he translated were Geohwa, Gunan, Balse-a, So-a Ron, and Sangseo. He was also involved in the compilation of textbooks used for teaching Manchu to Koreans, and served as an interpreter for Korean prisoners of war captured by Qing forces during the second Manchu invasion of Korea.

Notes

References

External links
Entry on EnCyber, the online edition of Doosan Encyclopedia
Entry on Nate internet portal encyclopedia

Manchurologists
Translators from Korean
Translators to Korean
17th-century Korean people
Interpreters
Year of birth missing
Year of death missing